Scotch Hausen is an album from Chiptune/Breakcore artist DJ Scotch Egg. some of his tracks on this album are remakes of Johann Sebastian Bach, Karlheinz Stockhausen, Terry Riley, Philip Glass and Moondog, and features a less abrasive sound than the first album. The song 'Scotch Ruins' is an earlier tune that was untitled and Shige used to play live, and it has been remastered for this album.

Track listing

Intro
Scotch Bach 2
Scotch Hausen
Scotch Ruins
Scotch Bach
Pin-Pon
No Beats
Scotch Sundance
Scotch Radio
Scotch Sundance 2
Scotch Sundance 3
Scotch Moondog

Remakes
this list is incomplete. you can help by expanding it.

'Intro' is a remake of Wolfgang Amadeus Mozart's Eine Kleine Nachtmusik.
'Scotch Hausen' is a remake of Johann Sebastian Bach's Toccata and Fugue in D minor.
 Likewise, 'Scotch Sundance' is based on Bach's Little Fugue in G minor, BWV 578.

External links
ADAADAT's upcoming release page.
includes the new video for 'Scotchausen'.

DJ Scotch Egg albums
2007 albums